Essl or ESSL may refer to:

 Essl Social Prize
 The ICAO code of Linköping/Saab Airport in Linköping, Sweden
 European Severe Storms Laboratory, a non-profit organization dedicated to basic and applied research on severe convective storms

People 
  Karlheinz Essl (b. 1960), Austrian composer
 Georg Essl (b. 1972), Austrian computer scientist and musician
 Michaela Eßl (b. 1988), Austrian ski mountaineer

Association 
 ESSL Basket-ball, a basket-ball club of a small town : Saint-Léger-aux-Bois - Oise - FRANCE